Gertrude Jacoba Malcorps (born 7 February 1921) is a Dutch retired swimmer who won a silver medal in the 4×100 m freestyle relay at the 1938 European Aquatics Championships.

Malcorps had an elder brother Max Malcorps (1917–2011), a mayor of Hasselt, Overijssel (1948–1971) and Harderwijk (1971–1978). On 21 May 1942 she married Huibert Hendrik Kervers.

References

1921 births
Possibly living people
Dutch female freestyle swimmers
European Aquatics Championships medalists in swimming
Sportspeople from Zwolle
20th-century Dutch women